807 Naval Air Squadron (807 NAS) was a Naval Air Squadron of the Royal Navy.

Second World War
807 Squadron was formed at RNAS Worthy Down in September 1940, equipped with Fairey Fulmar Is. Re-equipped with Fulmar IIs in April 1941, 807 Squadron joined  and saw action defending the Malta convoys between July and September. Many of the squadron's aircraft were lost in the sinking of Ark Royal in November 1941. Four surviving machines were flown off to North Front, Gibraltar. The squadron was gradually re-equipped with replacement Fulmars, which were joined by Sea Hurricanes, after which the squadron joined .

807 Squadron received Supermarine Seafires in June 1942, and rejoined HMS Furious in August. They took part in Operation Torch, the North African landings, and by March 1943 were back in the UK. The squadron returned to Britain aboard , subsequently joining the 4th Naval Fighter Wing.

Elements of the squadron were lent to the Desert Air Force serving in Italy for several weeks in April 1944, with the entire squadron flying off HMS Hunter to support Operation Dragoon, the landings in the South of France in August 1944. In March 1945 the squadron joined the Eastern Fleet aboard HMS Hunter and provided cover during the re-occupation of Rangoon, and attacks on enemy shipping in the Andaman Sea.

Recommissioning
The squadron was recommissioned on 1 October 1958 at RNAS Lossiemouth under the command of Lieutenant Commander Keith Leppard. 807 NAS immediately began a hectic work up period and participated in a major exercise 15 days after commissioning. 807 remained at Lossiemouth throughout 1959, working up and taking part in exercises and trials.

Aerobatic displays
In September 1959 the squadron performed in front of thousands of spectators at Farnborough Airshow with a display of formation aerobatics. The naval aviators began their display with a six stream takeoff to form a four aircraft aerobatic team and two soloists. One of the singletons performed a target banner pick up using an extension fitted to its deck arrestor hook. Meanwhile, the four aircraft formation returned for a transonic pass at 700 mph followed by a short aerobatic display devised by Keith Leppard.

Included in this sequence was what the Naval commentator described as an 'original manoeuvre', a fast pass in open box formation with a rapid individual roll by each Supermarine Scimitar; the Twinkle Roll was created. The two singletons touched down from the left and immediately folded their wings whilst one aircraft from the other four detached and approached from the right, landing head on between them.

Ship-based service
On 10 November 1959 Lieutenant N. Grier-Rees RN carried out a successful ejection from a Scimitar when his flying controls locked. The squadron finally embarked on HMS Ark Royal on 3 March 1960 where it remained for the next year, taking part in major exercises and carrying out cold weather trials in the Arctic Circle. In March 1961, 807 transferred from Ark Royal to HMS Centaur. Scimitar operations from this ship proved difficult due to her small size and slower speed than Ark Royal, resulting in restrictions on launch and recovery weights. This prevented them from being used to their limits; problems that became more acute in tropical climates with little or no natural wind.

Before leaving for the Far East in October 1961 the aircraft were modified to carry AIM-9 Sidewinder air-to-air missiles and AGM-12 Bullpup air-to-ground missiles. The latter were command guided by a joystick in the cockpit of the launching aircraft. Flight refuelling capability was also added at this time. On 21 October 1961 Lieutenant P.M. Hessey fired the first successful live Sidewinder from a British aircraft when he destroyed a meteor target aircraft over the Aberporth Ranges. After seven months in the Middle and Far East 807 NAS disbanded aboard Centaur in Portsmouth on 17 May 1962.

References

Citations

Bibliography
Scimitar by D. Gibbings & J. A. Gorman,

External links
Wartime history of 807 squadron

800 series Fleet Air Arm squadrons